The 2013 STP 400 was a NASCAR Sprint Cup Series stock car race that was held on April 21, 2013, at Kansas Speedway in Kansas City, Kansas, United States. Contested over 267 laps on the 1.5–mile (2.4 km) tri-oval, it was the eighth race of the 2013 Sprint Cup Series championship. Matt Kenseth of Joe Gibbs Racing won the race, his second win of the 2013 season and second straight at Kansas Speedway, while Kasey Kahne finished second. Jimmie Johnson, Martin Truex Jr. and Clint Bowyer rounded out the top five

This was the third straight Sprint Cup race of 2013 where the winner won from the pole and led the most laps, following wins by Jimmie Johnson at Martinsville and Kyle Busch at Texas. This was the first such streak in over 28 years (the last time there were three straight races won from the pole was in 1985; with Bill Elliott at Michigan, Dale Earnhardt at Bristol, and Elliott at Darlington).

Report

Background

The track's turns are banked from seventeen to twenty degrees, while the front stretch, the location of the finish line, is nine to eleven degrees. The back stretch, opposite of the front, is at only five degrees. The racetrack has a seating capacity for more than 72,000 spectators. Denny Hamlin was the defending race winner after winning the event in 2012.

Before the race, Jimmie Johnson was leading the Drivers' Championship with 269 points,  while Kyle Busch stood in second with 251 points. Greg Biffle followed in the third position, four points ahead of Brad Keselowski and five ahead of Carl Edwards in fourth and fifth. Dale Earnhardt Jr., with 234, was two points ahead of Kasey Kahne and twenty-six ahead of Clint Bowyer, as Paul Menard was two points ahead of Matt Kenseth and fourteen ahead of Kevin Harvick in tenth and eleventh. Jamie McMurray completed the first twelve positions with 190 points.

Practice and qualifying

Three practice sessions are scheduled to be held before the race. The first session, held on April 19, 2013, was 90 minutes long. The second and third were held on April 20, and were 55 and 50 minutes long, respectively. During the first practice session, Edwards was quickest with a time of 28.117 seconds, ahead of Ricky Stenhouse Jr. and Sam Hornish Jr. in second and third. Martin Truex Jr. followed in the fourth position, ahead of Aric Almirola in fifth.

During qualifying, forty-four cars were entered, meaning only one car was not able to start because of NASCAR's qualifying procedure. Kenseth clinched his ninth career pole position, with a record-setting time of 28.145 seconds. After his qualifying run, Kenseth commented, "We didn't think we had a chance. It's unexpected, and it's one of the fastest tracks of the year. Felt great to go out late and jump over the other guys." He was joined on the front row of the grid by Edwards. Stenhouse Jr. qualified third, Hornish Jr. took fourth, and Kyle Busch started fifth. Almirola, Truex Jr., Mark Martin, Ryan Newman, and Bowyer completed the first ten positions on the grid. The driver who failed to qualify for the race was Joe Nemechek.

In the Saturday morning session, Juan Pablo Montoya was quickest, ahead of Stenhouse Jr. and Almirola in second and third. Biffle and Edwards followed in the fourth and fifth positions. Truex Jr., Kyle Busch, Earnhardt Jr., Menard, and Newman rounded out the first ten positions. In the final practice session for the race, Kenseth was quickest with a time of 28.615 seconds. Almirola followed in second, ahead of Montoya and Kurt Busch in third and fourth. Kahne, who was twelfth quickest in second practice, managed fifth.

Race

Start
The race started at 1:16 p.m. EDT with Matt Kenseth leading the field to the green flag, The first caution came out on lap 6 when Kyle Busch spun out in the back straightaway, the race restarted on lap 9, The second caution came out on lap 39 when Dave Blaney blew an engine and collided into Danica Patrick, the race restarted on lap 43, A couple of laps later, the third caution then came out for debris on lap 75, the race restarted on lap 78, The fourth caution then came out on lap 87 when Elliott Sadler spun out, the race restarted on lap 91, with Matt Kenseth the race leader.

Second half
The fifth caution came out on lap 106 for a two-car wreck involving Kyle Busch and Joey Logano. The race restarted on lap 115 with Martin Truex Jr. the race leader, the sixth caution then came out on lap 174 when Brian Vickers spun out, the race restarted with 89 laps to go, The seventh caution came out for a multi-car wreck involving Marcos Ambrose, Casey Mears and Josh Wise, the race restarted with 81 laps to go, A couple of laps later, Debris on the back straightaway brought out the eighth caution of the day, with 50 laps to go, the race restarted with 43 laps to go with Matt Kenseth the race leader, Matt Kenseth won his race in Kansas.

Results

Qualifying

1.  Jeff Gordon collided into the SAFER barrier and failed to complete his qualifying lap.

Race results

Standings after the race

Drivers' Championship standings

Manufacturers' Championship standings

Note: Only the first twelve positions are included for the driver standings.

References

STP 400
STP 400
STP 400
NASCAR races at Kansas Speedway